Johan Hoogewijs (born 22 December 1957, Belgium) is a Flemish Belgian composer and sound designer, best known for his music to Flemish and Dutch TV series such as Heterdaad, Russen and Witse. Hoogewijs composed also the scores for the Dutch movies Zinloos (2004) and Winky’s Horse with Jan Decleir (2005).

Selected filmography

Music for TV series

 Boeketje Vlaanderen (1984)
 Postbus X (1988)
 Langs De Kade (1988)
 Lava (1989)
 Junglebook (1992)
 Caravas (1992)
 Niet voor Publicatie (1994)
 Interflix (1994)
 Kulderzipken (1996)
 Heterdaad (1996)
 Russen (2000–2004) Dutch TV serie (42 episodes)
 Liefde & Geluk (2001)
 Veel geluk, professor (2001)
 Alexander (2001)
 Witse (2001–2007) (with Toots Thielemans)
 De Vijfhoek (2012)

Music for movies

 Mémoures d’une princesse des Indes (1997)
 De Trein naar Kongo (1998)
 Verweesde liefdesbrieven (2000)
 Sin (2000)
 De Blauwe Roos (2002)
 L’Homme Qui Voulait Classer le monde (2002)
 Zinloos (2004) Dutch movie by Arno Dierickx
 Winky’s Horse (2005) Dutch movie
 Mass Moving (2007)
 Achtste Groepers Huilen Niet (2012)

solo project 

 Colouring the Keys (2022)

External links 
 Official site
 Johan Hoogewijs at The Internet Movie Database

1957 births
Living people
20th-century classical composers
Belgian composers
Male composers
Belgian musicians
21st-century classical composers
Belgian film score composers
Male film score composers
21st-century Belgian musicians
20th-century Belgian musicians
20th-century Belgian male musicians
21st-century male musicians